Karata is a rural locality (a selo) and the administrative center of Akhvakhsky District of the Republic of Dagestan, Russia. Population:

References

Notes

Sources

Rural localities in Akhvakhsky District